Gabriel Bengtsson Oxenstierna af Korsholm och Wasa, 1st Count of Korsholma and Vaasa, Finnish: Gabriel Pentinpoika Oxenstierna, (18 March 1586 at Lindholmen Castle, Västergötland – 12 December 1656 at Edsberg Manor, Sollentuna) was a Swedish statesman, jurist and diplomat.

Biography 
Oxenstierna was the son of Bengt Gabrielsson Oxenstierna the Elder, councillor to Duke Charles of Södermanland, Närke and Värmland (later King Charles IX), and his first wife Sigrid Gustafsdotter (Tre Rosor). He was orphaned at an early age.

Like other contemporary members of the influential Oxenstierna family, he was educated abroad and entered the service of King Charles IX upon his return in 1606. He retained royal favour during the rule of King Gustavus Adolphus and was made Governor-General of Reval and Swedish Estonia in 1611, subsequently being appointed Privy Councillor and Master of the Ordnance in 1617. Alongside his more famous cousins, Lord Chancellor Axel Oxenstierna and Gabriel Gustafsson Oxenstierna, he was made responsible for arming the Swedish army during the Polish–Swedish War and was part of the governing council in the King's absence. He was made Hovrättsråd and Lawspeaker of Värmland in 1627 and was part of the Swedish diplomatic delegation to the Holy Roman Emperor during the 1630 peace negotiations in Danzig.

In 1631, he was appointed Governor-General of Finland, continuing the work of his predecessor Nils Turesson Bielke to improve the central administration and legal system. He returned to Stockholm after the death of King Gustavus Adolphus to become part of the regency council for Queen Christina in 1633, becoming Lord High Treasurer of Sweden in 1634. However, the Chancellor Axel Oxenstierna and Steward Gabriel Gustafsson Oxenstierna thought him less suited for the post, as he was inexperienced on state economics and unable to stop the embezzlement of state funds during the regency. In 1645, the Oxenstierna administration was removed by Queen Christina upon reaching maturity.

The Queen appointed Oxenstierna Governor-General of Swedish Livonia in 1645, a post which he resigned from in 1647. He was created 1st Count of Korsholma and Vaasa by the Queen in 1651, one of the largest fiefdoms in Sweden, and was appointed supreme naval administrator as Lord High Admiral of Sweden in 1652, without previous naval experience.

He improved the finances of his county, but received numerous complaints from the peasantry of Ostrobothnia due to tax increases and labour requirements.

Oxenstierna died in 1656 at Edsberg Manor in present-day Sollentuna and was buried in Fasterna Church.

Family 
Oxenstierna married Anna Gustafsdotter Banér (1585–1656) in Stockholm on 7 October 1610. He fathered eleven children, among them Gabriel, Bengt and Gustaf Gabrielsson Oxenstierna.

He was older half-brother to Bengt Bengtsson Oxenstierna and cousin to Axel and Gabriel Gustafsson Oxenstierna.

Oxenstierna founded the comital af Korsholm and Wasa branch of the Oxenstierna family, the only male-line branch still in existence today.

References 

 Nordisk familjebok, Oxenstierna, 13. Gabriel Bengtsson, 1904–1926.

|-

Swedish counts
1586 births
Gabriel Bengtsson
1656 deaths
People from Lidköping Municipality
17th-century Swedish judges
Diplomats of the Swedish Empire
Swedish admirals
Lawspeakers
Members of the Privy Council of Sweden
17th-century Swedish politicians
Swedish Governors-General of Finland